Symphlebia nigranalis is a moth in the subfamily Arctiinae. It was described by Schaus in 1915. It is found in Brazil.

References

Moths described in 1915
Symphlebia